5th ZAI Awards

Presenter Union of Authors and Performers 

Broadcaster STV 

Grand Prix František Griglák

◄ 4th │ 6th ►

The 5th ZAI Awards, honoring the best in the Slovak music industry for individual achievements for the year of 1994, took time and place on February 24, 1995, at the Park kultúry a oddychu in Bratislava.

Winners

Main categories

Others

References

External links
 ZAI Awards > Winners (Official site)

05
Zai Awards
1994 music awards